Euryabax colossus is a species of beetle in the family Carabidae, the only species in the genus Euryabax.

References

Pterostichinae